Joseph Gist (January 12, 1775March 8, 1836) was a U.S. Representative from South Carolina.

Born near the mouth of Fair Forest Creek in the Union District of the Province of South Carolina. Gist moved to Charleston with his parents in 1788. He attended the common schools. He graduated from the College of Charleston. He studied law, was admitted to the bar in 1799, and began practice in Pinckneyville, South Carolina, in 1800. He served as member of the State house of representatives from 1802 to 1817. He served as member of the board of trustees of South Carolina College at Columbia 1809–1821.

Gist was elected as a Democratic-Republican to the Seventeenth Congress, re-elected as a Jackson Republican to the Eighteenth Congress, and elected as a Jacksonian to the Nineteenth Congress (March 4, 1821 – March 3, 1827).
He was not a candidate for renomination.
He resumed the practice of law.
He died in Pinckneyville, on March 8, 1836.
He was interred in the family burial ground.

Sources

1775 births
1836 deaths
Democratic-Republican Party members of the United States House of Representatives from South Carolina
Jacksonian members of the United States House of Representatives from South Carolina
19th-century American politicians